This is a list of public holidays in Bonaire.

References

Bonaire
Bonaire
Bonaire
Bonaire culture